A nicotinic agonist is a drug that mimics the action of acetylcholine (ACh) at nicotinic acetylcholine receptors (nAChRs). The nAChR is named for its affinity for nicotine.

Examples include nicotine (by definition), acetylcholine (the endogenous agonist of nAChRs), choline, epibatidine, lobeline, varenicline and cytisine.

History 

Nicotine has been known for centuries for its intoxicating effect. It was first isolated in 1828 from the tobacco plant by German chemists Posselt and Reimann.

The discovery of positive effects from nicotine on animal memory was discovered by in vivo researches in the mid 1980s. Those researches led to a new era in studies of nicotinic acetylcholine receptor (nAChR) and their stimulation but until then the focus had mainly been on nicotine addiction. The development of nAChR agonists began in the early 1990s after the discovery of nicotine's positive effects. Some research showed a possible therapy option in preclinical researches. ABT-418 was one of the first in a series of nAChR agonists and it was designed by Abbott Labs. ABT-418 showed significant increase of delayed matching-to-sample (DMTS) performance in matured macaque apes of different species and sex. ABT-418 has also been examined as a possible treatment to Alzheimer's disease, Parkinson's disease and attention-deficit hyperactivity disorder: those experiments showed positive outcomes.

One of the first nAChR active compounds, besides nicotine, that was marketed as a drug was galantamine, a plant alkaloid that works as a weak cholinesterase inhibitor (IC50=5µM) as well as an allosteric sensitizer for nAChRs (EC50=50 nM).

Nicotinic acetylcholine receptors and their signaling system

Signaling system
In the human nervous system nicotinic cholinergic signals are extended throughout the system, where the neurotransmitter acetylcholine (ACh) plays a key role in activating ligand-gated ion channels. The cholinergic system is a vital nervous pathway, where cholinergic neurons synthesize, store and release the neurotransmitter ACh. The main receptors that convert the ACh messages are the cholinergic muscarinic acetylcholine receptors, neuronal and muscular nAChRs. When looking back at evolutionary history, ACh is considered to be the oldest transmitter molecule and became present before the nervous cell. In the nervous system cholinergic stimulation mediated through nAChRs controls pathways such as release of transmitters and cell sensitivity, which can influence physiological activity including sleep, anxiety, processing of pain and cognitive functions.

Nicotinic acetylcholine receptors 
nAChRs are cholinergic receptors found in the central nervous system (CNS), peripheral nervous systems (PNS) and skeletal muscles, these receptors are ligand-gated ion channels with binding sites for acetylcholine and other molecules. When ACh or other agonists bind to the receptors it stabilizes the open state of the ion channel allowing influx of cations such as potassium, calcium and sodium ions. The nAChRs are made up by different subunits which determine the quaternary structure of the receptor, those subunits are α subunits (α1−α10), β subunits (β1−β4), one δ subunits, one γ subunit and one ε subunit. nAChRs can be either heteromeric or homomeric. The heteromeric receptors found in the central nervous system are made up by two α subunits and three β subunits with the binding site at the interface of α and the adjacent subunit. These receptors contain two binding sites per receptor and have different affinity for chemicals based on the composition of subunits. Both binding sites work together and thus, both sites need to be occupied with a nAChR agonist so that channel activation can take place. nAChRs containing α2−α6 and β2−β4 subunits have been shown to have higher affinity for ACh than other receptors. Homomeric receptors contain 5 identical subunits, they have 5 binding sites located at the interface between two adjacent subunits. In the year 2000 two homomeric receptors had been identified in humans, the α7 and α8 receptors.

Binding site
There are two binding sites on heteromeric nAChRs; to stabilize the open form of nAChRs, both binding sites must be occupied by agonist, such as nicotine or ACh. 
The ACh binding site of nAChR is made up by six loops, termed A–F. The A, B and C loops of the binding site are part of the α subunit and are the principal components of the binding site. The adjacent subunit to the α subunit (γ, δ, ε or β) contains the D, E and F loops.

Mechanism of action

α4β2 receptor agonists 
α4β2 nAChRs contain two α4 subunits and three β2 subunits, therefore it has two binding sites for ACh and other agonists. α4β2 nAChRs account for approximately 90% of the nAChRs in the human brain and when chronically exposed to nicotine or other nicotine agonists leads to increase in density of α4β2 receptors which is the opposite of what usually happens when other receptors are chronically exposed to their agonists. The α4β2 receptor has been widely studied in regards to Alzheimer's disease as well as for nicotine dependence and in 2009 several drugs are on the market that target the α4β2 nAChR specifically.

α7 receptor agonists 
α7 receptors are homomeric neuronal acetylcholine receptors consisting of five α7 subunits and has five ACh binding sites. Abnormality in the α7 receptors expression have been reported to influence progression of diseases such as Alzheimer's disease and schizophrenia. The α7 are not believed to have as much affinity for nicotine as the heteromeric receptor but instead they have shown more affinity for alpha bungarotoxin which is a nicotinic antagonist found in venom of some snakes. Targeting of α7 receptors is therefore thought to be useful in treatment of Alzheimer's disease and schizophrenia.

Muscle type receptor agonists 
nAChR are found in the neuromuscular junction on skeletal muscles. Two different receptors have been found, one of which has primarily been found in adults contains two α1 subunits, one β1, one ε and one δ, the other one has been found in fetuses and contains γ subunit instead of the ε subunit. The nAChRs take part in the depolarization of the muscular endplate by increasing cation permeability leading to contraction of skeletal muscles. The nAChRs found in the skeletal muscle system have two ACh binding sites, one of which is found at the interface between α1 and δ subunits while the other one is found at the interface between α1 and γ or ε subunits. Among nAChR antagonists designed specifically for the neuromuscular system are nerve gases and other poisons designed to quickly kill humans or other animals and insects.

Binding
ACh binds to nAChR because of charge difference between the molecule and the surface of the receptor. When binding to nAChR ACh fits into a binding pocket shaped by loops A, B and C which belong to α subunit and the adjacent subunit. When ACh is fitted into the binding pocket the loops of the nAChR undergo movement that leads to a coordination of the ACh molecule in the pocket enhancing the chemical bonds between the molecule and the receptor. After movement of the loops that belong to α subunit it's sometimes possible for the ACh molecule to form a bond, e.g. salt bridge, to the adjacent subunit enhancing the bonds between the receptor and ACh even further.

Drug design 
Drugs that influence nAChRs can be agonists, partial agonists or antagonists. Agonists, e.g. nicotine, can however act as depolarizing agents when encountered to nAChRs for some time (seconds or minutes, depending on concentration and nAChR subtype), chronic exposure to agonist can also lead to long lasting functional deactivation because of rapid and persistent desensitization. Partial nAChR agonists have been studied since they seem to be helpful in smoking cessation. The partial agonists are believed to bind to the nAChRs and stimulate the release of dopamine in smaller portions than the agonists and therefore compensate for the absence of nicotine.The lack of specificity among some of the nicotinic agonists is well known and is a potential problem when using them to treat illnesses that require targeting a specific subtype of nAChRs. Among these nonspecific agonists are for example ACh, nicotine and epibatidine that all target more than one subtype of nAChRs.

Pharmacophore 

The development of nAChR agonist pharmacophore started in 1970 when it was proposed that the binding of the agonists to a receptor was dependent on a positively charged nitrogen atom and a hydrogen bond forming from carbonyl oxygen atom in acetylcholine or a nitrogen atom in (S)-nicotine. Since then it has been shown that a cationic center, atoms that are electronegative and able to form hydrogen bonds along with the center of the pyridine ring in (S)-nicotine are favorable. Stereochemistry is a part of the pharmacophore as is clearly seen with (S)- and (R)- nicotine where the (S)-enantiomer is 10-100 times more potent. The azabicyclic ring of epibatidine is another example of favorable steric interactions to the receptors. It has been suggested that a specific internitrogen distance, N+-N, is important for agonist affinity but debate has arisen over its influence. A newer theory is that a distance of 7-8 Å between points that complement the protonated nitrogen atom and hydrogen bond acceptor will enhance the potency. Low electronic density close to the protonated nitrogen and higher electron density close to the pyridine ring is favored in protonated nicotine ligands containing pyridine ring. In later years researchers have taken more interest in the α7 and α4β2 subtype receptors in drug development to treat nicotine dependence and cognitive impairment such as Alzheimer's.

Structure-activity relationships

Structure-activity relationships: Muscle nAChR agonists 
Various models have been run where the affinity of nAChR agonists to the receptor subtype are tested to help identify the molecules, groups and steric conformation that are vital to greater affinity. By using a nAChR muscle receptor subtype (α1)2β1δγ model the following results were obtained:

anatoxin > epibatidine > acetylcholine > DMPP >> cytisine > pyrantel > nicotine > coniine > tubocurare > lobeline,

where anatoxin had the highest activity efficacy and tubocurare the lowest. Acetylcholine on the other hand induced a much longer opening time of the receptor though anatoxin is more potent. The results suggest that anatoxin derivatives would be helpful in understanding structure-activity relationships (SAR) for muscle nAChRs.

Succinylcholine chloride, which is a drug that's already on the market, is a bischoline ester and a short acting muscle relaxant. Bischoline esters are compounds that can act as a competitive agonist on muscle type nAChRs and have been used in SAR studies. In a Torpedo (α1)2β1δγ nAChR model it was demonstrated that the potency of bischoline ester agonists is dependent on the chain length as potency increases with longer chains. Efficacy seems to be independent of chain length since the highest efficacy is seen in bischoline esters with four to seven  units and is lower for both fewer  units and more.

Structure-activity relationships: α4β2 nAChR agonists 

Combination of structural elements of ACh and nicotine as well as reducing the conformational flexibility by using a cyclopropane ring has led to the discovery of potent and selective α4β2 nAChR ligands. The modulation of three structural elements, the linker, substitution on the amino group and the pyridine ring can be used to determine the influence on potency and selectivity of the ligands. Factors that decrease the binding are steric hindrance on the amino group and linkers that are saturated/unsaturated carbon chains. Short-chained ether linkers are preferred. Beneficial effects on the binding is seen with substitution on the pyridine ring both mono- and disubstitution with halogens among other groups. Substitution on the amino group with three different amides increased the binding affinity where methylamide had the highest binding. Lower binding in the other substituted amides was explained by steric hindrance or lack of a methyl group resulting in loss of hydrophobic interaction. Stereochemistry of pyridine nitrogen and/or the pyridine ring and its stereoelectronic effects has a subtle beneficial effect on the binding to the α4β2 nAChR. Thus it was shown that a pyridyl ether ligand with bromo substitution on the pyridine and metylatedamide on the amino group had the highest potency.

Structure-activity relationships: α7 nAChR agonists 

The search for selective and potent α7 nAChR agonists has produced a series of compounds that have good potential as drug candidates. One such search produced SEN12333/WAY-317538 among other compounds that have desirable pharmacokinetic profiles and are selective of α7 nAChRs over α1, α3 and α4β2 nAChRs. Structure activity relationships for these compounds have been proposed. The optimal pharmacophore of α7 nAChR agonist is made of three parts. There is a basic moiety connected to a carbon chain linked to an aromatic moiety by an amide bridge. The amide bridge can be inverted without affecting the potency of the agonist. A biaryl group shows more potency than a monoaryl group as the aromatic moiety and substitution at position 2 on the later aryl group will further increase the potency. Potency is higher for agonists with H+ donor/acceptor on the later aryl group on the biaryl group. A high number of hydrogen bond acceptors could decrease permeability across the blood–brain barrier (BBB) due to the polar surface area and needs to be taken into account when designing agonists to target α7 nAChRs.

Various cyclic amine groups can act as the basic moiety and potency stays relatively unchanged for example aryl piperazine, piperidine and morpholine. An acyclic tertiary amine is tolerated as the basic moiety but larger steric groups are less tolerated.

Many derivatives of quinuclidine such as quinuclidine amide are known to be α7 nAChR agonists. SAR studies for quinuclidine amide have identified factors that are affecting the potency and affinity of these agonists. Para substitution on the quinuclidine ring and the 3-(R) configuration in the stereochemistry is favored. Enhanced activity is observed when a 5 membered ring is fused to aromatic moiety. Further enhancement is seen when the fused ring is able to supply electron resonance to the amide carbonyl whereas the activity will diminish when the fused ring contains a hydrogen bond donating atom. The rigidity of quinuclidine and the orthogonal orientation of the nitrogen bridge in relations to the amide carbonyl group is presumed important for the optimal binding. The stability of some of the more potent quinuclidine amide derivatives in rat in vitro models have been low however by adding a methyl group to position 2 on the quinuclidine ring the stability has increased greatly.

Drug development
The development of nicotinic acetylcholine receptor agonists began in the early 1990s after the discovery of nicotine's positive effects on animal memory. The development of nicotinic acetylcholine receptor agonists has come a long way since then. Nicotinic acetylcholine receptor agonists are gaining increasing attention as drug candidates for multiple central nervous system disorders such as Alzheimer's disease, schizophrenia, attention-deficit hyperactivity disorder (ADHD) and nicotine addiction. Nicotinic acetylcholine receptors are receptors found in the central nervous system, the peripheral nervous systems and skeletal muscles. They are ligand-gated ion channels with binding sites for acetylcholine as well as other agonists. When agonists bind to a receptor it stabilizes the open state of the ion channel allowing influx of cations.

In 2009 there were at least five drugs on the market that affect the nicotinic acetylcholine receptors.

Products of nicotinic agonist

Other nicotinic agonists, albeit generally with limited clinical use, include:
 lobeline, an agonist on Ganglion type nicotinic receptors and also affects sensory nerve terminals
epibatidine, an agonist on Ganglion type, α4β2 and α7 receptors
 decamethonium causes depolarization block on muscle type receptors, similarly to suxamethonium

Nicotinic versus muscarinic activity

Current status
Currently nicotine receptor agonist research and drug designing is aimed for treatment of multiple diseases and disorders of the CNS.

Targacept has three drug candidates that are in clinical trials; AZD3480 (TC-1734) for ADHD which is currently in phase II clinical trials, AZD1446 (TC-6683) for Alzheimer's disease in collaboration with AstraZeneca and TC-5619 for cognitive dysfunctions in schizophrenia.

Memory pharmaceuticals with its partner Roche has one drug candidate, MEM 3454 (RG3487), a partial agonist of the nicotinic α7 receptor, for Alzheimer's disease.

Abbott Laboratories in partnership with NeuroSearch have two drug candidates in clinical trials, ABT-894, a selective α4β2 nicotine receptor agonist, for ADHD and ABT-560, a neuronal nicotinic receptor modulator, which was selected by Abbott in 2006 as a new development candidate for cognitive dysfunctions.

EnVivo pharmaceuticals has one drug candidate in clinical trials, EVP-6124, a selective α7 nicotine receptor agonist for Alzheimer's disease and schizophrenia and one follow-up compound, EVP-4473, that has successfully completed pre-clinical development.

See also 
 Muscarinic acetylcholine receptor
 Muscarinic agonist
 Muscarinic antagonist
 Nicotinic acetylcholine receptor
 Nicotinic antagonist
 Parasympathomimetic drug

References

External links 

 
 

Drug discovery